In economics, a base period or reference period is a point in time used as a reference point for comparison with other periods. It is generally used as a benchmark for measuring financial or economic data. Base periods typically provide a point of reference for economic studies, consumer demand, and unemployment benefit claims.

In public transport scheduling, the base period is the period of reduced service on weekdays that generally exists between the morning and afternoon rush hours.

See also
 Base period price
 Bureau of Labor Statistics
 Economic indicator
 Gross domestic product
 Consumer price index

References

External links
 Base period in glossary, U.S. Bureau of Labor Statistics Division of Information Services
 Base Period, Investopedia

Economic data
Public transport